Nicholas Julian Cook was CEO of defence industry consultant firm Dynamixx. He is a British former aviation journalist as well as the author of fiction and non-fiction works.

Journalism
In the 1990s, Cook was the aviation editor of Jane's Defence Weekly, the international defence journal. He was an aerospace consultant and contributor to the journal from 2002 to 2008.

He won four Journalism Awards from the Royal Aeronautical Society in the Defence, Business, Technology, and Propulsion categories.

Books
The Hunt For Zero Point, published by Century Random House in the UK in 2001 and Broadway Books in the US in 2002, details Cook's ten-year investigation into efforts to crack the Holy Grail of aerospace propulsion: anti-gravity technology. It focuses on Igor Witkowski's claims that the Nazis developed a UFO-like device which allegedly became the basis for US research.

Cook has also written two novels, Angel Archangel and Aggressor, as well as ghostwriting a number of books predominantly on military subjects.

Television
The 1999 Discovery Channel documentary Billion Dollar Secret followed Cook's investigation into secret US military spending and experimental aircraft that may have been mistaken for UFOs. He also wrote and presented the 2005 documentary UFO's: The Secret Evidence, known as An Alien History of Planet Earth in the US.

Other media appearances
He has been a frequent guest on Coast To Coast AM, a radio show that deals with the paranormal and conspiracy theories.

Other work
Cook was the founder and CEO of Dynamixx, a consultancy that brought together the defence industry and the search for solutions to climate change. His current focus is on writing and corporate storytelling.

References

External links 
 Official website

Living people
British writers
Year of birth missing (living people)